Alex Nibourette (born December 26, 1983) is a Seychellois football player.  He is a striker on the Seychelles national football team.

Nibourette helped Seychelles win the football tournament at the 2011 Indian Ocean Games in August 2011.

References

External links

1983 births
Living people
Seychellois footballers
Seychelles international footballers
Association football forwards